Linda Buckley (born 4 April 1979) is an Irish art music composer and musician. Her work has been performed by the BBC Symphony Orchestra, RTÉ National Symphony Orchestra, Crash Ensemble, Icebreaker and Iarla Ó Lionaird. She has received a Fulbright Scholarship and the Frankfurt Visual Music Award.

Career
Born at the Old Head of Kinsale, County Cork, Buckley studied at University College Cork and graduated with an MA in music and media technology from Trinity College Dublin. She studied composition with John Godfrey, David Harold Cox, Donnacha Dennehy, and Roger Doyle.<ref>Johanne Heraty: Buckley, Linda", in The Encyclopaedia of Music in Ireland, ed. by Harry White and Barra Boydell (Dublin: UCD Press, 2013), pp. 137–138.</ref>

In 2008, Buckley featured in a "Composer's Choice" series of concerts at the National Concert Hall, Dublin. She was RTÉ Lyric FM's resident composer during 2011–2012. Her work featured in the 2017 New Music Dublin Festival at the National Concert Hall, Dublin and by the Crash Ensemble at the 2012 Huddersfield Contemporary Music Festival.

In 2016, Buckley worked with uilleann piper David Power on the composition Antarctica which premiered that year at the Kilkenny Arts Festival. The Irish Timess Gemma Tipton wrote that "the music is beguiling."

In 2017, she was interviewed about her work by Iarla Ó Lionaird as part of the RTÉ Lyric FM series Vocal Chords: In Conversation.

In 2018, her work Discordia was performed at the Barbican Theatre. Later that year she composed a score for the 1922 film Nosferatu'' with her sister Irene by request of the Union Chapel, London. The same year composer Christopher Fox wrote in the Cambridge University Press publication Tempo about her contributions to modern composition.

Buckley has lectured in composition at the Royal Conservatoire of Scotland, Trinity College Dublin and Pulse College Dublin.

Reception
Buckley has been described by music writer Bob Gilmore as "a leading figure in the younger generation of Irish composers" and by Tim Rutherford-Johnson as "a combination of bold assertiveness and a smooth, glassy elegance".

References

External links
 Linda Buckley's website

1979 births
21st-century classical composers
Academics of the Royal Conservatoire of Scotland
Academics of Trinity College Dublin
Electroacoustic music composers
Irish women classical composers
Living people
Musicians from County Cork